Brøndby Strand is a railway station on the Køge radial of the S-train network in Copenhagen, Denmark. 
It serves the southern end of Brøndby municipality.

See also
 List of railway stations in Denmark

References

S-train (Copenhagen) stations
Buildings and structures in Brøndby Municipality
Railway stations opened in 1972
Buildings and structures in the Capital Region of Denmark
Railway stations in Denmark opened in the 20th century